is a Japanese writer and director. Born 13 June 1965  in Tokyo, Japan. Hiroshi Ando has several films to his credit including Saraba gokudo dead beat, Blue, Kokoro to karada and Boku wa imōto ni koi o suru. Blue was entered into the 24th Moscow International Film Festival.

References

1965 births
Living people
Japanese film directors
People from Tokyo